= Lawrence Hall (St. Cloud University) =

Residence hall

Coordinates: 45.5533°N 94.1480°W

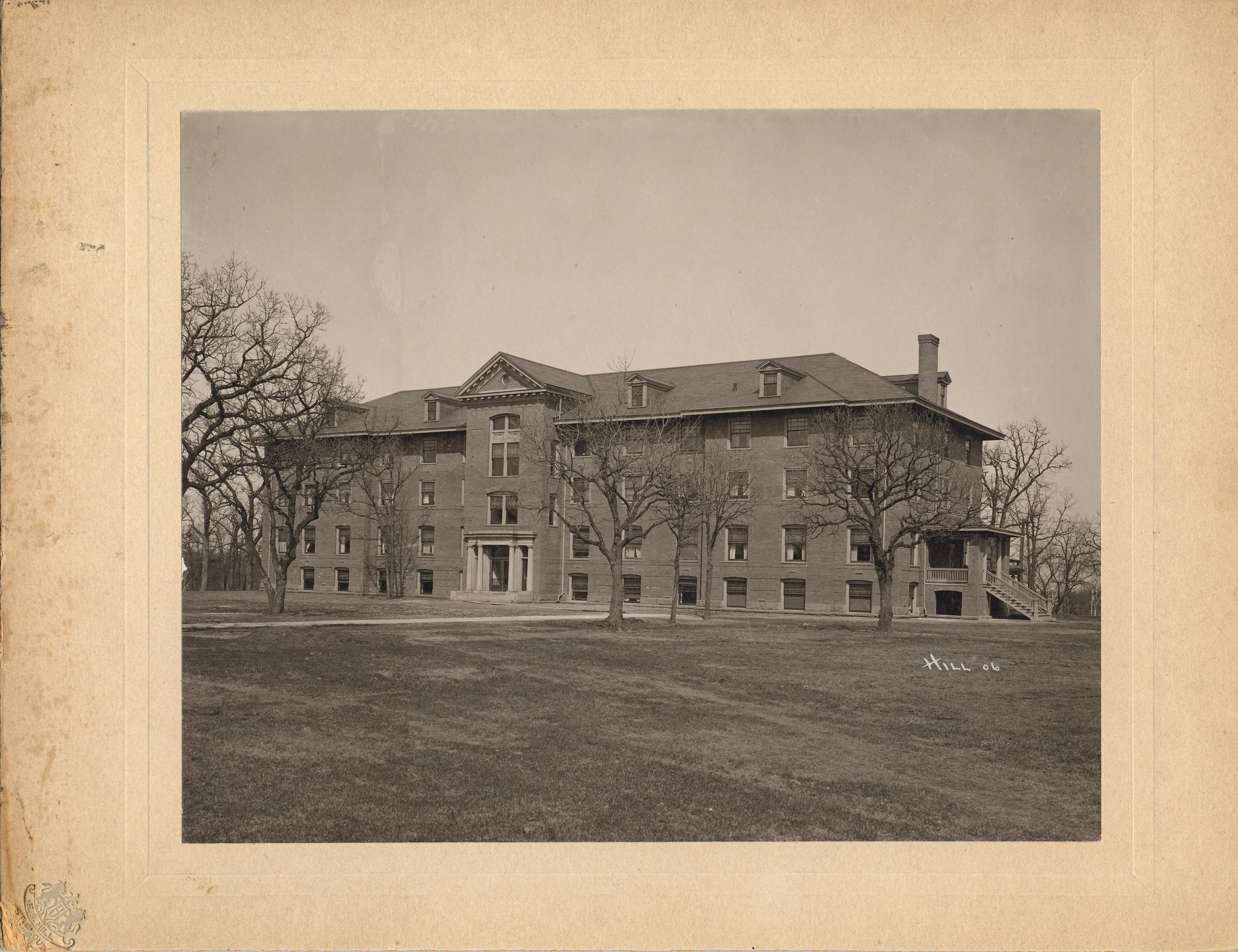
Lawrence Hall pictured in 1906

In December 1905, the new Lawrence Hall opened as a residence hall at St. Cloud State University. It is the oldest standing campus building.

== Location ==
Lawrence Hall stands on the site of the first Lawrence Hall. That building was destroyed by fire on January 14, 1905. No one perished in the fire, but its contents were a complete loss.

== History ==
In March 1905, the state legislature appropriated US$50,000 to construct a new residence hall. State architect Charles Johnston completed the plans for the "new" Lawrence Hall in early May 1905 (his first St. Cloud State campus building) and O'Neil and Son of Faribault, Minnesota, were named as general contractor on May 27, 1905. Work started two days later to remove the remains of the gutted dormitory and begin new construction.

On December 20, 1905, women began to move into the new Lawrence Hall that day, less than a year after the first Lawrence Hall was destroyed by fire. The building was dedicated on June 13, 1906, in conjunction with spring commencement activities featuring Minnesota governor J.A. Johnson.

Lawrence Hall mostly did serve as a residence hall but had other purposes. During World War II, the 72nd College Training Detachment arrived on campus in very early March 1943 and used Lawrence Hall as its barracks. Due to a shortage of space, the U.S. government contracted with colleges and universities across the country to provide facilities and training for air cadets. The detachment moved out in time for the fall 1944 academic term and the building returned to housing female students.

Beginning in fall 1969, Lawrence Hall no longer housed students and was converted to faculty offices. The newly opened 14-story Sherburne Hall now housed students who may have resided in Lawrence Hall. The building continued as office space until 1991.

Lawrence Hall was rededicated on August 28, 2003.

== Architecture and fittings ==
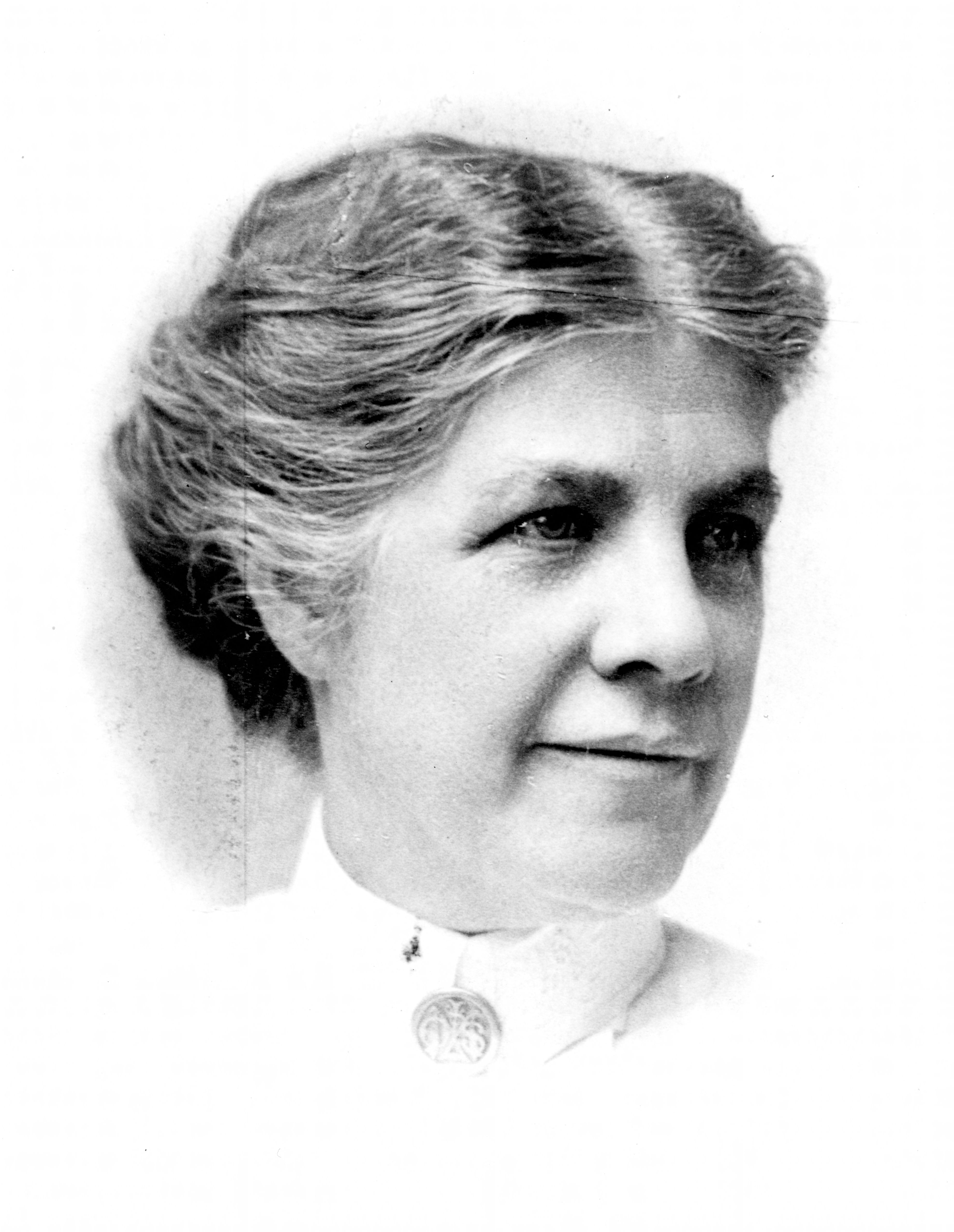
Isabel Lawrence

The building is Georgian Revival in style which adheres to rigid symmetry and elements borrowed from Greek, Roman, and Renaissance architecture. On the eastern coast of the United States, this style reflected the classical education that served as a bedrock for a liberal education. These styles spread westward and found homes on campuses everywhere.

Lawrence Hall has four stories, 180 foot long, and 50-foot-wide building with 32,000 square feet of space to be home to 150 women. The building was made of reddish brick with gray granite trimmings and contained a basement dining room that sat 200. 100,000 pressed bricks, 600,000 common bricks, 90 cords of stone, 1200 loads of sand, 25,000 hollow tile, and 30,000 feet of Georgia pine flooring were used in its construction.

== Renovation ==
Plans were in works for renovations in the 1980s. In September 1989, the Minnesota State University System board approved a request for Lawrence Hall to be renovated rather than replace it with a new 350 bed resident hall. Not until 2001 did the state appropriate funds to modernize the building.

A year-long $6.4 million renovation began in the summer of 2002. When the renovated Lawrence Hall opened in the fall of 2003, it housed 100 international students as well as the Center for International Studies and the department of Foreign Languages and Literature. The renovation also added a cupola, which concealed the newly installed elevator shaft.

Its restoration is a fine example of contemporary restoration work.
